William P. O'Neill (1909 – date of death unknown) was a New Zealand international lawn bowler.

Bowls career
He competed in the first World Bowls Championship in Kyeemagh, New South Wales, Australia in 1966 and won a gold medal in the fours with Norm Lash, Ron Buchan and Gordon Jolly at the event.

He won the 1954, 1960 and 1963 fours title at the New Zealand National Bowls Championships when bowling for the Carlton Bowls Club.

Awards
He was inducted into the New Zealand Sports Hall of Fame.

References

1909 births
Date of death unknown
New Zealand male bowls players
Bowls World Champions
Bowls players at the 1962 British Empire and Commonwealth Games
Commonwealth Games competitors for New Zealand
20th-century New Zealand people